Professor Eugene Byron Smalley (1926–2002) was an American plant pathologist. Smalley joined the University of Wisconsin-Madison in 1957 with the specific aim of finding a way to control Dutch elm disease  Assembling seeds from around the northern hemisphere, Smalley developed resistant strains of elms which were patented and released to commerce, notably 'Sapporo Autumn Gold', and 'New Horizon'.

Publications

References

1926 births
2002 deaths
Botanists with author abbreviations
American phytopathologists
American botanists
20th-century agronomists